Lashtu (also Romanized as Lashtū; also known as Lashtoon) is a village in Goli Jan Rural District, in the Central District of Tonekabon County, Mazandaran Province, Iran. At the 2006 census, its population was 430, in 131 families.

References 

Populated places in Tonekabon County